Oorantha Sankranthi is a 1983 Telugu-language drama film, produced by Kodali Bosu Babu Kotagiri Gopal Rao under the Veera Rani Enterprises & Kotagiri Films banner and directed by Dasari Narayana Rao. It stars Akkineni Nageswara Rao, Krishna, Sridevi,  Jayasudha  and music composed by S. P. Balasubrahmanyam.

Plot
The film begins in a village, its President Raghavaiah (Satyanarayana), who leads a happy family life along with his wife Bhanumathi (Rajasulochana) and two sons Venu (Akkineni Nageswara Rao) & Gopi (Krishna) as elder one Venu is the step-son to Bhanumathi looks him down. Parallelly, Kotaiah (Rao Gopala Rao), brother-in-law to Raghavaiah is a vicious person who also stays with them. Gopi loves his daughter Satya (Sridevi) and Venu falls in love with a poor girl Durga (Jayasudha). Meanwhile, Govt sanctions Rs. 50,000 to the village panchayat, Kotaiah snatches it by threatening the Gumustha Ranga Rao (Sakshi Ranga Rao) which leads to the resignation of Raghavaiah. Thereafter, Kotaiah ploys to become President of the village and creates a lot of atrocities to which Venu stands as a barrier. So, Kotaiah intrigues by creating disputes in the family through Venu's love affair which Raghavaiah opposes. At present, Venu leaves the house when Gopi supports his brother and performs his marriage. After some time, Kotaiah wants to construct a hospital by exiling the destitute's hamlet on a selfish motto. Raghavaiah tries to stop him, in turn, gets insulted. At that moment, Venu aids his father when he understands the virtue of his son and gets him back home. Now Kotaiah misleads Gopi, generates a margin between the brothers, and separates the family. Due to this Raghavaiah passes away. Eventually, Gumustha Ranga Rao returns when Venu warns him. Exploiting it, Kotaiah slays Ranga Rao, indicts Venu, and gets him arrested. Here Gopi realizes the truth and protects his brother. At last, both of them see the end of Kotaiah. Finally, the entire family is reunited and the movie ends on a happy note with the marriage of Gopi & Satya.

Cast

Akkineni Nageswara Rao as Venu
Krishna as Gopi 
Sridevi as Satya 
Jayasudha as Durga
Rao Gopal Rao as Kotaiah
Satyanarayana as Raghavaiah 
Allu Ramalingaiah as Appanna
Giri Babu as Giri 
Nagesh as Tippanna 
Sakshi Ranga Rao as Gumustha Ranga Rao 
Vankayala Satyanarayana as M.L.A.
Suryakantam as Hostel Warden 
Rajasulochana as Bhanumathi
Rama Prabha as Ganga 
Mamatha as Mangatayaru
Dubbing Janaki as Ranga Rao's wife 
Nirmalamma as Durga's Bamma

Soundtrack

Music composed by S. P. Balasubrahmanyam. Lyrics were written by Dasari Narayana Rao. Music released on SEA Records Audio Company.

References

External links 
 

Films directed by Dasari Narayana Rao
Films scored by S. P. Balasubrahmanyam